P. F. Volland Company of Chicago, Illinois published poetry books, greeting cards, music, children's books, calendars, cookbooks, and children's occupational games, between 1908 and 1959.  The press was noted for using new printing processes, including off-set printing techniques, and color illustrations.  The P. F. Volland Company is also known for the many significant artists and writers whose work it published.

Founder
Paul Frederick John Volland Hughes Phelps (April 24, 1875 – May 5, 1919) was a 20th century publisher, and the founder of the P. F. Volland Company.  In 1908, he would become the founder of the P. F. Volland Company, which would work to publish poetry books, greeting cards, music, children's books, calendars, cookbooks, and children's occupational games, all between 1908 and 1959. He also became a publisher during the time period following the foundation of the company. In 1917, Volland would publish the book New Adventures of Alice, made by John Rae. On May 5, 1919, Volland was shot and killed by Vera Trepagnier in a business dispute in the Volland offices.

Volland Ideal

The Volland Ideal was used to market P. F. Volland's lines of children's books.  The Volland Ideal was "that books should make children happy and build character unconsciously and should contain nothing to cause fright, suggest fear, glorify mischief, excuse malice or condone cruelty."

History

Christmas cards were added as a product line in 1909.

After 1912, the firm had offices in the Monroe Building (across the street from the Art Institute), which were designed by the well-known architect Walter Burley Griffin. Griffin also had offices in the Monroe Building and his wife, architect Marion Mahony Griffin, provided illustrations for some of P. F. Volland's greeting cards.

In 1916, the firm moved to a new space in the Garland Building, 58 East Washington Street, Chicago, Illinois.

In 1917, the company was incorporated in Delaware.

In 1919, the firm participated in the Victory Loan drive organized by the Liberty Loan Committee for the Publishing, Printing, Advertising, and Allied Interests.

Frederick J. Clampitt, who had been a silent partner and an executive member of the firm since 1916, became president of P. F. Volland after Paul Volland's death in 1919. Other officers of the company in 1919 were W. R. Anderson, vice president; H. S. Adams, secretary; Edwin J. Clampitt, assistant treasurer; James R. Offield, member of board of directors; Maurice Berkson, member of board of directors.  J. P. McEvoy headed up the editorial department.

The New York representative of the firm was Francis H. Evans. In 1929, the New York representative of the firm was Harry A. Moore.

The P. F. Volland Company merged with the Gerlach Barlow Company in 1924 and moved some of its offices to the Gerlach Barlow Building in Joliet, Illinois. The Volland brand name continued to be used for Volland products. The Volland offices at 58 E. Washington in Chicago, Illinois were retained and sold both the Volland and Gerlach Barlow lines.

After World War II, Volland produced greeting cards for the emerging African American market.

By 1935, the book titles published by Volland were acquired by other publishers, including Wise Book Company and M.A. Donahue.

The Shaw Barton Company, a competitor of the Gerlach Barlow Company, purchased the company in 1959 and closed down the Joliet operation.

Authors and illustrators of the P.F. Volland Co.
Volland hired many significant early 20th century artists and writers. Many worked as freelancers.
Sarah Addington
Ottillie Amend
Alice Cooper Bailey
Henry Turner Bailey
Temple Bailey
Maginel Wright Barney
Eleanore Barte
Mary R. Bassett
Clara Doty Bates
L. Frank Baum
Betty Baxter
Frances Beem
Erick Berry
John Gabbert Bowman
Claire A. Briggs
Philip Broughton
Carmen L. Browne
Thornton W. Burgess
Edgar Rice Burroughs
Bonibel Butler
George Frank Butler
Ve Elizabeth Cadie
Eleanor Campbell
Lang Campbell
Ruth Campbell
Lewis Carroll
William Herbert Carruth
Russell Gordon Carter
Gertrud Caspari
Madison Cawein
Ethel Clere Chamberlin
Padraic Colum
Nancy Cox McCormack
Elizabeth T. Corbett
Frank Crane
Pauline Croll
Gladys Signey Crouch
Alice Ross Culver
Gertrude K. Day
Katherine Sturges Dodge
Carrie Dudley
Mary Ellsworth
Rachel Robinson Elmer
Georgene Faulkner
Eveline Foland
James W. Foley
Marion Foster
Fontaine Fox
Frances Margaret Fox
Ellery Friend
John Archer Gee
Elisa Leypold Good
Elizabeth Gordon
Douglas Grant
Marion Mahony Griffin
Edwin Osgood Grover
Eulalie Osgood Grover
Johnny Gruelle
Justin C. Gruelle
Mercer Gruelle
Molly Anderson Haley
Maude McGehee Hankins
Muriel E. Halstead
Julia Dyar Hardy
Ruby Hart
Dick Hartley
Louise Marshall Haynes
John Held, Jr.
Helen West Heller
Arthur Henderson
D. Henderson
Charlotte B. Herr
Alice Higgins
Elizabeth O. Hiller
Caroline Hofman
Holling C. Holling
Lucille Webster Holling
R. S. Hubbell
Eleanore Mineah Hubbard
Carrie Jacobs-Bond
Norman Jacobsen
May Justus
Ilona de Karekjarto
Gertrude Alice Kay
Alexander Key
L. Kirby-Parrish
Edith Brown Kirkwood
S. E. Kiser
Clayton Knight
C. L. Kohler
Tom Lamb
W. T. Larned
Ring W. Lardner
Jeanette Lawrence
Ella Dolbear Lee
Michael Lipman
Albert Edgar Lownes
William Briggs MacHarg
Douglas Malloch
 Marion Mahony Griffin
George C. Mason
J. P. McEvoy
Jo McMahon
John L. Mee
Edna Merritt
Mildred Plew Merryman
Ervine Metzl
Nellie Burget Miller
Olive Beaupre Miller
Edith Mitchell
George William Mitchell
Lebbus Mitchell
Muriel Moscrip Mitchell
P. Moscheowitz
Gladys Nelson Muter
Marie Honre Myers
Wilbur D. Nesbit
David McCheyne Newell
June Norris
Joseph Pierre Nuytenns
Jane Ort
Margerita Osborne
John Edward Perkins
M. C. Potter
Edward Poucher
Jane Priest
Nina Wilcox Putnam
John Rae
Fletcher C. Ransom
Margaret Thomsen Raymond
Sybill Rebman
Earl H. Reed
Sidney Reid
Frederick Richardson
M. T. Ross
Herman Rosse
Ethel Rundquist
Frederic L. Ryder
Tony Sarg
Anna M. Scott
Janet Laura Scott
Wilhelmina Seegmiller
Charles Livingston Snell
Fairmont Snyder
Johanna Spyri
Beatrice Stevens
Robert Louis Stevenson
Wilhelmina Stitch
Charles H. Sylvester
Kate S. Teetshorn
Gustaf Tenggren
Mabel Dunham Thayer
Ruth Plumly Thompsen
Pamela Mori Tigher
Lew Tower
Helen Van Valkenburgh
Helen Vanderveer
Dugald Stewart Walker
Satella Waterstone
Mary L. Watson
Jessie Penniman White
Lois Willoughby
Dixie Willson
Edward Arthur Wilson
Isa L. Wright
Annette Wynne

Book series published by P.F. Volland
Classics series
Friendship series
Golden Youth series
Good Cheer series
Happy Children series
Hug Me Toy Books
Jolly Jingle series
Jolly Kid series
Punky Dunk
Philadelphia Ledger Newspaper Books
Read Me A Story series
Sunny Book series
Volland "Fairy Children" series
Volland Inglenook series

References

Bibliography

Defunct companies based in Chicago
1908 establishments in Illinois
Greeting cards
Book publishing companies based in Illinois
Defunct book publishing companies of the United States
1959 mergers and acquisitions